Ross Hutchins and Jamie Murray were the defending champions, but decided not to participate.

Harri Heliövaara and Denys Molchanov won the title, defeating John Paul Fruttero and Raven Klaasen 7–6(7–5), 7–6(7–3) in the final.

Seeds

Draw

Draw

References
 Main Draw

Tashkent Challenger - Doubles
2011 Doubles